Oshri Roash (Hebrew: אושרי רואש born 25 July 1988) is an Israeli former footballer. He played all his career for Hapoel Haifa.

He is of a Tunisian-Jewish descent.

External links
Oshri Roash – Reds

Living people
1988 births
Israeli Jews
Israeli footballers
Hapoel Haifa F.C. players
Liga Leumit players
Israeli Premier League players
Israeli people of Tunisian-Jewish descent
Footballers from Haifa
Association football defenders